Corruption in the Czech Republic is considered to be widespread by a majority of the Czech public, according to Transparency International’s Global Corruption Barometer 2013.

Transparency International's 2021 Corruption Perceptions Index scored the Czech Republic at 54 on a scale from 0 ("highly corrupt") to 100 ("highly clean"). When ranked by score, the Czech Republic ranked 49th among the 180 countries in the Index, where the country ranked first is perceived to have the most honest public sector.  For comparison, the best score was 88 (ranked 1), and the worst score was 11 (ranked 180).

Areas

Political corruption
A series of political corruption cases has damaged the image of Nečas’ administration (see corruption cases below), which is reflected in Transparency International's Global Corruption Barometer 2013, which reveals that 73% of the surveyed Czechs consider political parties to be “corrupt” or “extremely corrupt”.

Business corruption
In the World Economic Forum's Global Competitiveness Report 2013–2014, surveyed business executives cite corruption as the most problematic factor for doing business in the country. According to Ernst & Young's 2012 Global Fraud Survey, 80% of surveyed companies perceive bribery and corruption to be widespread in the business sector, and fewer than 10% state that between 2009 and 2011 their companies “very frequently/always” conducted due diligence on fraud and corruption-related risks before or after acquiring a new business.

Although the business environment is characterised by a clear set of rules and little interference, corruption remains an obstacle to doing business in public procurement, awarding of subsidies and direct interactions between public and private sectors.

Corruption cases
A case in 2009 involved Defence Minister Vlasta Parkanová overpaying for four aeroplanes in a 3.5 billion crown military contract. As a Member of Parliament, Parkanová was immune from criminal prosecution however. Finance Minister Miroslav Kalousek was also implicated in the case.

In June 2012, a former director of the entity in charge of allocating EU funds in the Liberec and Usti and Labem regions was sentenced to 7.5 years imprisonment and a US$40,000 fine after being convicted of bribery in connection with the granting of EU funds.

The 2013 Czech political corruption scandal involved an anti-corruption raid, launched by the organised crime unit. It resulted in the arrest of the prime minister's chief of staff, Jana Nagyová, and seven others. The unit also confiscated approximately GBR 5 million in cash and 10 kg of gold found in government offices, banks and private properties. The crimes are suspected to include bribery and abuse of power.

Enhancing Civil Society Participation 
Citizens participation and the values of integrity, accountability, and transparency are crucial components of fighting corruption. It is important to develop programs and actions to change the cultural understanding of corruption and help citizens to act against abuses.

See also 
 Crime in the Czech Republic
 International Anti-Corruption Academy
 Group of States Against Corruption
 International Anti-Corruption Day
 ISO 37001 Anti-bribery management systems
 United Nations Convention against Corruption
 OECD Anti-Bribery Convention
 Transparency International

References

External links
 Czech Republic Corruption Profile from the Business Anti-Corruption Portal

 
Politics of the Czech Republic
Czech
Czech